Gottfried I, Count of Sponheim  (c. 1115 - ff. 1183) was a member of the house of Sponheim and count at Sponheim from 1136 until his death, when he was succeeded by his son Gottfried II.

House of Sponheim
1110s births
1183 deaths